John Alfred Osborne (27 May 1936 – 2 January 2011) was a chief minister of Montserrat.

He first came to that position in November 1978, as a member of the People's Liberation Movement, and continued until losing legislative council elections on 10 October 1991. By 2001 he had switched parties, joining the New People's Liberation Movement. Under his leadership, the NPLM won 7 of 9 seats in legislative council elections on 2 April 2001, and he served as chief minister from 5 April 2001 until 3 June 2006 when he resigned after elections in which his party was defeated. A major issue for his government has been the continuing recovery of the island of Montserrat after a volcanic eruption which devastated the southern part of the island, burying the capital city of Plymouth in ash and forcing its population to flee, in many cases off the island due to lack of housing.  The eruption, which began in July 1995, continues today on a vastly reduced scale, the damage being confined to Plymouth and the surrounding areas.  , a new airport and docking facilities have opened and Montserratians and tourists alike are beginning to return.

In July 2008, Gerald's Airport in Montserrat was renamed John A. Osborne Airport in his honour. His daughter Shirley Osborne is the Speaker of the Legislative Assembly of Montserrat.

References

1936 births
2011 deaths
Chief Ministers of Montserrat
Alumni of the University of Manchester
New People's Liberation Movement politicians